Nancy Marie Mithlo is a Chiricahua Apache curator, writer and professor. Her exhibitions have been shown at the Venice Biennale. Mithlo has worked as the chair of American Indian Studies at the Autry National Center Institute and as a professor of gender studies and American Indian Studies at the University of California, Los Angeles. She is the author and editor of several books about Native Americans and indigenous art.

Biography 
Mithlo is Chiricahua Apache, is enrolled in the Fort Sill Apache Tribe, and has family in Apache, Oklahoma. She was born in 1961 and grew up in Mississippi.

Mithlo attended the Institute of American Indian Arts and earned her bachelor's degree from Appalachian State University in 1986, and her master's degree in anthropology from Stanford University in 1988. In 1993, she earned a doctorate in cultural anthropology from Stanford University.

Work 
Mithlo has worked as the chair of American Indian Studies at the Autry National Center Institute. She has worked as a professor of gender studies and American Indian Studies at the University of California, Los Angeles.

Mithlo has helped curate and create nine exhibits at the Venice Biennale. Two exhibitions, "Air, Land, Seed" and "Octopus Dreams," were shown in part in the 2013 Venice Biennale. In the exhibition, "The People's Home: The United American Indian Involvement Photographic Project" held at These Days Gallery in 2019, Mithlo looks into how Native Americans live in modern Los Angeles.

Mithlo edited Manifestations: New Native Art Criticism in 2011. Native People's Magazine wrote that Manifestations contained "an excellent cross-section of the Indigenous art community today." The Wíčazo Ša Review discusses how Manifestations focuses on how mentorship and continuity are important aspects of Indigenous art. In 2014, Mithlo edited a book about the work of Horace Poolaw, For a Love of His People: The Photography of Horace Poolaw. The Daily Beast called the book "an outstanding work of scholarship and a commanding visual document." Mithlo edited Making History, published by UNM Press, in late 2020. Mithlo describes the purpose of Making History is to provide "a scaffold of resources for emerging Native arts scholars, Native and non-Native readers, students, and academics who wish to understand the tenor and tone of what this field is about and how to approach teaching and learning about American Indian arts."

Selected bibliography 

 
 
 
 
Making History. University of New Mexico Press. 2020. ISBN 978-0826362094.

References

External links 
 Official site

Living people
Year of birth missing (living people)
Chiricahua people
Institute of American Indian Arts alumni
Institute of American Indian Arts faculty
Stanford University alumni
University of California, Los Angeles faculty
American women curators
American curators
Native American women academics
American women academics
Native American academics
21st-century American women writers
Native American curators
Appalachian State University alumni
20th-century Native American women
20th-century Native Americans
21st-century Native American women
21st-century Native Americans
20th-century American women writers
Writers from Mississippi
Fort Sill Apache Tribe